The Last Outlaw is a 1927 American silent Western film directed by Arthur Rosson and starring Gary Cooper, Jack Luden, and Betty Jewel. Written by John Stone and J. Walter Rubin, based on a story by Richard Allen Gates, the film is about a frontiersman who falls in love with a pretty woman whose brother is accused of murder. He tries to prove the young man innocent of the charges, but when he is appointed sheriff, he is obliged to track down and arrest the boy. A 16mm reduction positive print exists of this film.

Plot
On his way to Steer City, Buddy Hale (Gary Cooper) rescues Janet Lane (Betty Jewel) from a runaway horse. Unknown to Buddy, the woman's brother Ward (Jack Luden) just shot the sheriff. Heading a ring of indignant ranchers whose cattle are being systematically rustled, Ward suspects that the sheriff and Justice Bert Wagner are leading the gang of thieves. Justice Wagner makes Buddy sheriff and sends him to arrest his predecessor's murderer.

Soon after, Ward is deliberately shot by one of Wagner's accomplices, and Buddy returns the dying man to his sister. Thinking that Buddy shot him, she resents the new lawman. Later, Janet leads the other ranchers and steals back their cattle. At Chick's insistence, Janet discusses the situation with Buddy, who is convinced of Wagner's guilt. In an ensuing showdown, Butch and Wagner are killed in a cattle stampede, while Janet is saved by Buddy, who is then made mayor of Steer City.

Cast
 Gary Cooper as Sheriff Buddy Hale
 Jack Luden as Ward Lane
 Betty Jewel as Janet Lane
 Herbert Prior as Bert Wagner
 Jim Corey as Butch
 Billy Butts as Chick
 Hank Bell as Henchman (uncredited)
 Lane Chandler as Rancher (uncredited)
 Flash as The Horse (uncredited)

References

External links
 
 
 

1927 Western (genre) films
1927 films
American black-and-white films
Paramount Pictures films
Films directed by Arthur Rosson
Silent American Western (genre) films
1920s American films
1920s English-language films